Illah Bunu is a town in Kogi State in mid west Nigeria. It is about 45 minutes drive from Kabba town in Kogi State. The town is near Aiyegunle Gbede

Coordinate: 8.094284,6.080761

References

External links

Kabba/Bunu | Yoruba People

Kogi State